Gertrude of Saxony ( 1030 – August 4, 1113), also known as Gertrude Billung, was a countess of Holland by marriage to Floris I, Count of Holland, and countess of Flanders by marriage to Robert I, Count of Flanders. She was regent of Holland in 1061-1067 during the minority of her son Dirk V, and regent of Flanders during the absence of her spouse in 1086–1093.

Biography
She was the daughter of Bernard II, Duke of Saxony and Eilika of Schweinfurt.

Countess of Holland

In c. 1050, she married Floris I, Count of Holland (c. 1017 – June 28, 1061). Upon the death of her spouse in 1061, her son Dirk V became Count of Holland. Since he was a minor, she became regent.

When Dirk V came into power, William I, Bishop of Utrecht, took advantage of the situation, occupying territory that he had claimed in Holland. Gertrude and her son withdrew to the islands of Frisia (Zeeland), leaving William to occupy the disputed lands.

Countess of Flanders
In 1063 Gertrude married Robert of Flanders (Robert the Frisian), the second son of Baldwin V of Flanders. This act gave Dirk the Imperial Flanders as an appanage – including the islands of Frisia west of the Frisian Scheldt.

She and her husband then acted as co-regents of Holland for her son during his minority.

When her spouse left for a journey to Jerusalem in 1086–1093, Gertrude served as regent of Flanders during his absence.

Family and children
She had a total of seven children with Floris I, Count of Holland:
 Albert (b. ), a canon in Liège
 Dirk V (Vlaardingen – 17 June 1091)
 Peter (b. ), a canon in Liége
 Bertha ( – 15 October 1094, Montreuil-sur-Mer), who married Philip I of France in 1072.
 Floris (b. ), a canon in Liége.
 Matilda (b. ), who married Adalbert von Saffenburg von Klosterath.
 Adela (b. ), who married Baudouin I, Count of Guînes.

From her second marriage to Robert of Flanders she had five children:
 Robert II of Flanders (c. 1065 – October 5, 1111).
 Adela (d. 1115), who first married king Canute IV of Denmark, and was the mother of Charles the Good, later count of Flanders. She then married Roger Borsa, duke of Apulia.
 Gertrude, who married Theodoric II, Duke of Lorraine, and was the mother of Thierry of Alsace, also later count of Flanders.
 Philip of Loo, whose illegitimate son William of Ypres was also a claimant to the county of Flanders.
 Ogiva, abbess of Messines.

References

Sources

External links
Genealogy A-Z
Medieval Lands Project on Gertrude of Saxony

|-

|-

1030s births
1113 deaths
Year of birth uncertain
Countesses of Holland
Countesses of Flanders
House of Billung
11th-century women rulers
11th-century French nobility
12th-century French nobility
11th-century French women
12th-century French women
12th-century French people
11th-century Saxon people
12th-century Saxon people
11th-century German women
12th-century German women
Daughters of monarchs